An Ocean of Doubt is the fourth installment in The Emo Diaries series of compilation albums, released September 28, 1999, by Deep Elm Records. As with all installments in the series, the label had an open submissions policy for bands to submit material for the compilation, and as a result the music does not all fit within the emo style. As with the rest of the series, An Ocean of Doubt features mostly unsigned bands contributing songs that were previously unreleased. Notably, it features the first song released by Further Seems Forever.

Reviewer Heather Phares of Allmusic remarks that "the album catalogs emo's increasingly diverse sounds" and that it "reaffirm[s] Deep Elm's status as one of the best emo labels around."

Track listing

References

External links 
 An Ocean of Doubt at Deep Elm Records.

1999 compilation albums
Deep Elm Records compilation albums
Emo compilation albums
Indie rock compilation albums